Representative democracy, also known as indirect democracy, is a type of democracy where elected people  represent a group of people, in contrast to direct democracy. Nearly all modern Western-style democracies function as some type of representative democracy: for example, the United Kingdom (a unitary parliamentary constitutional monarchy), Germany (a federal parliamentary republic), France (a unitary semi-presidential republic), and the United States (a federal presidential republic).

Representative democracy can function as an element of both the parliamentary and the presidential systems of government. It typically manifests in a lower chamber such as the House of Commons of the United Kingdom, and the Lok Sabha of India, but may be curtailed by constitutional constraints such as an upper chamber and judicial review of legislation. Some political theorists (including Robert Dahl, Gregory Houston, and Ian Liebenberg) have described representative democracy as polyarchy. Representative democracy places power in the hands of representatives who are elected by the people. Political parties often become central to this form of democracy if electoral systems require or encourage voters to vote for political parties or for candidates associated with political parties (as opposed to voting for individual representatives).

Powers of representatives
Representatives are elected by the public, as in national elections for the national legislature. Elected representatives may hold the power to select other representatives, presidents, or other officers of the government or of the legislature, as the prime minister in the latter case.

The power of representatives is usually curtailed by a constitution (as in a constitutional democracy or a constitutional monarchy) or other measures to balance representative power:

An independent judiciary, which may have the power to declare legislative acts unconstitutional (e.g. constitutional court, supreme court).
The constitution may also provide for some deliberative democracy (e.g., Royal Commissions) or direct popular measures (e.g., initiative, referendum, recall elections). However, these are not always binding and usually require some legislative action—legal power usually remains firmly with representatives. 
In some cases, a bicameral legislature may have an "upper house" that is not directly elected, such as the Senate of Canada, which was in turn modeled on the British House of Lords.

Theorists such as Edmund Burke believe that part of the duty of a representative was not simply to communicate the wishes of the electorate but also to use their own judgment in the exercise of their powers, even if their views are not reflective of those of a majority of voters:

Certainly, Gentlemen, it ought to be the happiness and glory of a Representative, to live in the strictest union, the closest correspondence, and the most unreserved communication with his constituents. Their wishes ought to have great weight with him; their opinion, high respect; their business, unremitted attention. It is his duty to sacrifice his repose, his pleasures, his satisfactions, to theirs; and above all, ever, and in all cases, to prefer their interest to his own. But his unbiassed opinion, his mature judgment, his enlightened conscience, he ought not to sacrifice to you, to any man, or to any set of men living. These he does not derive from your pleasure; no, nor from the Law and the Constitution. They are a trust from Providence, for the abuse of which he is deeply answerable. Your representative owes you, not his industry only, but his judgment; and he betrays, instead of serving you, if he sacrifices it to your opinion.

History

The Roman Republic was the first known state in the Western world to have a representative government, despite taking the form of a direct government in the Roman assemblies. The Roman model of governance would inspire many political thinkers over the centuries, and today's modern representative democracies imitate more the Roman than the Greek model, because it was a state in which supreme power was held by the people and their elected representatives, and which had an elected or nominated leader. Representative democracy is a form of democracy in which people vote for representatives who then vote on policy initiatives; as opposed to direct democracy, a form of democracy in which people vote on policy initiatives directly. A European medieval tradition of selecting representatives from the various estates (classes, but not as we know them today) to advise/control monarchs led to relatively wide familiarity with representative systems inspired by Roman systems.

In Britain, Simon de Montfort is remembered as one of the fathers of representative government for holding two famous parliaments. The first, in 1258, stripped the king of unlimited authority and the second, in 1265, included ordinary citizens from the towns. Later, in the 17th century, the Parliament of England implemented some of the ideas and systems of liberal democracy, culminating in the Glorious Revolution and passage of the Bill of Rights 1689.  Widening of the voting franchise took place through a series of Reform Acts in the 19th and 20th centuries.

The American Revolution led to the creation of a new Constitution of the United States in 1787, with a national legislature based partly on direct elections of representatives every two years, and thus responsible to the electorate for continuance in office. Senators were not directly elected by the people until the adoption of the Seventeenth Amendment in 1913.  Women, men who owned no property, and Black people, and others not originally given voting rights, in most states eventually gained the vote through changes in state and federal law in the course of the 19th and 20th centuries. Until it was repealed by the Fourteenth Amendment following the Civil War, the Three-Fifths Compromise gave a disproportionate representation of slave states in the House of Representatives relative to the voters in free states.

In 1789, Revolutionary France adopted the Declaration of the Rights of Man and of the Citizen and, although short-lived, the National Convention was elected by all males in 1792. Universal male suffrage was re-established in France in the wake of the French Revolution of 1848.

Representative democracy came into general favour particularly in post-industrial revolution nation states where large numbers of citizens evinced interest in politics, but where technology and population figures remained unsuited to direct democracy. Many historians credit the Reform Act 1832 with launching modern representative democracy in the United Kingdom.

Globally, a majority of governments in the world are representative democracies, including constitutional monarchies and republics with strong representative branches.

Research on representation per se

Separate but related, and very large, bodies of research in political philosophy and social science investigate how and how well elected representatives, such as legislators, represent the interests or preferences of one or another constituency. The empirical research shows that representative systems tend to be biased towards the representation of more affluent classes, to the detriment of the population at large.

Criticisms
In his book Political Parties, written in 1911, Robert Michels argues that most representative systems deteriorate towards an oligarchy or particracy. This is known as the iron law of oligarchy.<ref>Zur Soziologie des Parteiwesens in der modernen Demokratie. Untersuchungen über die oligarchischen Tendenzen des Gruppenlebens (1911, 1925; 1970). Translated as Sociologia del partito politico nella democrazia moderna : studi sulle tendenze oligarchiche degli aggregati politici, from the German original by Dr. Alfredo Polledro, revised and expanded (1912). Translated, from the Italian, by Eden and Cedar Paul as Political Parties: A Sociological Study of the Oligarchical Tendencies of Modern Democracy'" (Hearst's International Library Co., 1915; Free Press, 1949; Dover Publications, 1959); republished with an introduction by Seymour Martin Lipset (Crowell-Collier, 1962; Transaction Publishers, 1999); translated in French by S. Jankélévitch, Les partis politiques. Essai sur les tendances oligarchiques des démocraties, Brussels, Editions de l'Université de Bruxelles, 2009.</ref>
Representative democracies which are stable have been analysed by Adolf Gasser and compared to the unstable representative democracies in his book Gemeindefreiheit als Rettung Europas which was published in 1943 and a second edition in 1947. Adolf Gasser stated the following requirements for a representative democracy in order to remain stable, unaffected by the iron law of oligarchy: 
 Society has to be built up from bottom to top. As a consequence, society is built up by people, who are free and have the power to defend themselves with weapons.
 These free people join or form local communities. These local communities are independent, which includes financial independence, and they are free to determine their own rules.
 Local communities join into a higher unit, e.g. a canton.
 There is no hierarchical bureaucracy.
 There is competition between these local communities, e.g. on services delivered or on taxes.

A drawback to this type of government is that elected officials are not required to fulfill promises made before their election and are able to promote their own self-interests once elected, providing an incohesive system of governance. Legislators are also under scrutiny as the system of majority-won legislators voting for issues for the large group of people fosters inequality among the marginalized.

Proponents of direct democracy criticize representative democracy due to its inherent structure. As the fundamental basis of representative democracy is non inclusive system, in which representatives turn into an elite class that works behind closed doors, as well as the criticizing the elector system as being driven by a capitalistic and authoritarian system.

Proposed solutions
The system of stochocracy has been proposed as an improved system compared to the system of representative democracy, where representatives are elected. Stochocracy aims to at least reduce this degradation by having all representatives appointed by lottery instead of by voting. Therefore, this system is also called lottocracy. The system was proposed by the writer Roger de Sizif in 1998 in his book La Stochocratie''. Choosing officeholders by lot was also the standard practice in ancient Athenian democracy and in ancient India. The rationale behind this practice was to avoid lobbying and electioneering by economic oligarchs.

The system of deliberative democracy is a mix between a majority ruled system and a consensus-based system. It allows for representative democracies or direct democracies to coexist with its system of governance, providing an initial advantage.

References

External links

 

Democracy
Types of democracy